The Minstrel Show is the second studio album by hip hop trio Little Brother. It followed the critical success of their 2003 debut, The Listening. The album was highly anticipated and touted as a probable breakthrough for the group, even before its release. The title is a reference to the minstrel shows that were popular in the United States during the 19th century.

Themes
The album has a running concept based on a fictional television network called "UBN" (U Black Niggas Network), which is a satire of stereotypical programs and advertisements for African Americans. For example, on "Cheatin", Phonte (performing under his alter-ego "Percy Miracles"), spoofs the over-dramatic R&B sagas performed by singers such as R. Kelly and Ronald Isley. Many of the skits contain tongue-in-cheek references to black pop-culture in the United States.

Controversy 
For many reasons, the furor surrounding The Minstrel Show overshadowed the music itself. On August 16, 2005, hip hop magazine The Source's Editor-in-Chief, Joshua "Fahiym" Ratcliffe, announced his retirement due to conflicting opinions on the rating The Minstrel Show was to receive in the next issue of the publication. According to Ratcliffe, his original rating of 4.5 (out of 5) was reduced to 4 by the magazine's Chief Brand Executive, Raymond "Benzino" Scott and CEO Dave Mays because Ratcliffe gave then-upcoming artist Young Jeezy a rating of 4. After they refused to change the rating back to 4.5 he decided to step down from his editorial position. For his part, Benzino admitted at the time of questioning, that he had yet to listen to the album for himself and had no problem with Ratcliffe's original rating.

While this may have built up anticipation for the album, another more serious obstacle reared its head when the entertainment network BET (Black Entertainment Television) refused to play the group's video for the single, "Lovin' It", allegedly because they deemed it "too intelligent". Michael Lewellen, a publicist and program director for BET, responded, "It's not true, not in that context. BET reserves the right to show or not to show music videos of any type based on the network's own standards and decision-making processes." In a portion of the video, the group lightly pokes fun at the different stylistic aspects of hip hop subgenres such as "gangsta", "backpack", "earthy" and "icy". The rest of it sees them performing to a zealous crowd.

Reception 

In contrast to the reaction of BET, Little Brother received praises from many powerful forces within the hip hop world, such as XXL magazine, who gave the album an "XL" rating and most notably, Scratch Magazine, who gave it a perfect 10 out of 10 rating. Despite all the controversy, The Minstrel Show debuted at a #56 position on the Billboard charts selling 18,000 copies in its first week out (a much lower number than expected by both fans and critics). A second official single and any further promotion of the album was abandoned by Atlantic Records, and although the group soon began recording their follow-up album, Getback, their relationship with the label drew to a close before its release.

Track listing
Unless otherwise indicated, Information is based on the album’s Liner Notes

Notes 
(*) indicates the Performer contributed Additional Background Vocals to the track.

Album samples songwriting credits
Information is based on the album’s Liner Notes
Welcome to the Minstrel Show and Minstrel Show Closing Theme
"No Stronger Love" as performed by The Floaters; written by Arnold Ingram, James Mitchell and Marvin Willis
Beautiful Morning
"What's Happening, Baby?" as performed by The Stylistics; written by George David Weiss, Hugo Peretti and Luigi Creatore
The Becoming
"Circles" as performed by Rufus & Chaka Khan; written by Tim Dulaine (aka Tony Dulaine)
Not Enough
"Easy, Easy, Got To Take It Easy" as performed by Teddy Pendergrass; written by Gene McFadden, John Whitehead and Victor Carstarphen
Hiding Place
"Jealous Love" as performed by Bobby Womack; written by Bobby Womack and Cecil Womack
Slow It Down
"Slow Dance" as performed by David Ruffin; written by C. Curtis Gadson, Rosslyn Sanders and Rollin Sanders
Say It Again
"Do Something Special (For Your Lady)" as performed by Five Special; written by Jerry Q. Jones and Ron Banks
Lovin' It
"One Night Affair" as performed by The Stylistics; written by Teddy Randazzo, Roger Joyce and Victoria Pike
All for You
"I Really Hope It's You" as written and performed by Michael Franks
Watch Me
"With a Child's Heart" as performed by Michael Jackson; written by Henry Cosby, Sylvia Moy and Victoria Basemore
Sincerely Yours
"Whatever Goes Around" as performed by Jerry Butler; written by Terry Callier and Larry Wade
Hold On (Tellin' Me) (B-Side of "Lovin' It" single)
"Sitting On The Edge Of My Mind" as performed by Jermaine Jackson; written by Garfield, Fletcher, O'Hara and O'Hara

References

2005 albums
Little Brother (group) albums
Albums produced by 9th Wonder
Albums produced by Khrysis
Albums produced by Nicolay (musician)
Atlantic Records albums